The 2018 New Brunswick general election was held on September 24, 2018, to elect the 49 members of the 59th New Brunswick Legislature, the governing house of the province of New Brunswick, Canada.

Two smaller parties — the People's Alliance and the Greens — made breakthroughs, winning three seats each, and potentially holding the balance of power. The People's Alliance entered the legislature for the first time, while the Greens increased their seat count from one. This marked the first time since the 1991 election that four parties won representation in the legislature.  The election was also contested by the provincial New Democrats, newcomers KISS NB, and eight independents.

This is the first election since 1920 that did not return a majority for any party. The Progressive Conservatives won the most seats, with 22, but incumbent Liberal Premier Brian Gallant, whose party secured only 21 seats despite winning the popular vote by six percentage points, indicated that he would seek the confidence of the legislature and attempt to form a minority government.

On September 25, Gallant met with the Lieutenant Governor Jocelyne Roy-Vienneau and received permission to continue in office. On November 2, Gallant's minority government was defeated in a non-confidence vote. On November 9, Progressive Conservative leader Blaine Higgs was sworn in as premier with a minority government.

Timeline
 September 22, 2014 – The New Brunswick Liberal Association, led by Brian Gallant, won a narrow majority government, defeating incumbent Premier David Alward's Progressive Conservatives, which became the second single-term government in New Brunswick's history.
 September 23, 2014 - Alward announces his resignation as Progressive Conservative leader.  
 October 18, 2014 - Bruce Fitch became interim leader of the Progressive Conservative Party. 
 December 10, 2014 - The NDP executive rejects Cardy's resignation as leader, urging him to continue and offering him a salary as he has been working as leader on a volunteer basis. 
 October 22, 2016 - Blaine Higgs becomes the leader of the Progressive Conservative Party in a leadership election.
 January 1, 2017 - Dominic Cardy resigns as leader of the NDP, and as a party member. He subsequently joins the PCs as Chief of Staff to Leader Blaine Higgs.
 January 8, 2017 - Rosaire L'Italien is chosen as interim leader of the NDP by the party's executive.
 August 10, 2017 - Jennifer McKenzie is acclaimed as the new leader of the NDP.

Summary of seat changes

Results 

|-
! colspan=2 rowspan=2 | Political party
! rowspan=2 | Party leader
! colspan=5 | MLAs
! colspan=4 | Votes
|-
! Candidates
!2014
!Dissol.
!2018
!±
!#
!%
! ± (pp)
!% whererunning

|align=left|Blaine Higgs
|49
|21
|21
|22
|1
|121,300
|31.89%
|2.75
|31.89%

|align=left|Brian Gallant
|49
|27
|24
|21
|3
|143,791
|37.80%
|4.92
|37.80%

|align=left|Kris Austin
|30
|–
|–
|3
|3
|47,860
|12.58%
|10.44
|20.60%

|align=left|David Coon
|47
|1
|1
|3
|2
|45,186
|11.88%
|5.27
|12.41%

|align=left|Jennifer McKenzie
|49
|–
|–
|–
|–
|19,039
|5.01%
|7.97
|5.01%

|align=left|KISS NB
|align=left|Gerald Bourque
|9
|–
|–
|–
|–
|366
|0.10%
|
|0.49%

| style="text-align:left;" colspan="2"|Independent
|8
|–
|1
|–
|1
|2,821
|0.74%
|0.15
|4.46%

| style="text-align:left;" colspan="4"|Vacant
|2
| colspan="5"|
|-style="background:#E9E9E9;"
|-style="background:#E9E9E9;"
|colspan="8" align="left"|Ballots rejected
|1,412
|colspan="2"|
|- style="background:#E9E9E9;"
| style="text-align:left;" colspan="3"|Total
|241
|49
|49
|49
|–
|381,775
|100.00%
|
|-style="background:#E9E9E9;"
|colspan="8" align="left"|Eligible voters and turnout
|568,671
|67.13%
|2.48
|}

Results by region

Detailed analysis

Aftermath

On election night, Higgs claimed victory, saying his team had received a mandate; however, Gallant did not resign, instead stating his intent to remain in office by securing support on a vote-by-vote basis. The following day, Gallant met with Lieutenant Governor Jocelyne Roy-Vienneau and received permission to continue in office and attempt to seek confidence of the legislature. On September 27, Higgs met with Roy-Vienneau, and was told that if Gallant was unable to secure the confidence of the House, he would be called on to form government; shortly afterwards, Higgs called on Gallant to either resign or immediately recall the legislature.

In the immediate aftermath of the election, both Kris Austin of the People's Alliance and David Coon of the Green Party were noncommittal in their support: Austin pledged to work with any party willing to work with him, but said the party won't sacrifice its "values and ideals" to do so; while Coon said his caucus would take time to figure out how they would align themselves, but would not be able to work with anyone uncommitted to rights for linguistic minorities or combatting climate change. Gallant opted to pursue a partnership with the Green Party, ruling out any arrangement with the PCs or PA because they don't share Liberal "values". Higgs initially ruled out any formal agreements with other parties, but later said that a four-year agreement like in British Columbia would be ideal for stability.

Austin agreed to support to a Progressive Conservative government for 18 months, though no formal agreement was made. Coon said his party would negotiate with both the Liberals and Progressive Conservatives. On October 10, Coon announced that the Green Party would not formally side with either party, and would base their votes on their own "declaration of intent". Accordingly, Coon said that their support for the throne speech depends on its "merits", and that his caucus would be free to vote their own way on the speech.

The results drew notice elsewhere in Canada. Parti Québécois leader Jean-François Lisée described the results as "an advertisement for our proposal for proportional representation." Andrew Weaver, leader of the Green Party of British Columbia, suggested that Coon should make an agreement with the Progressive Conservatives. The Globe and Mail published an editorial calling for electoral reform, as did National Post columnist Andrew Coyne.

On November 1, Gallant's Liberal minority government was defeated by a non confidence vote (25-23) by the opposition Progressive Conservatives and People's Alliance. On November 9, Blaine Higgs was sworn in as premier.

Opinion polls

Candidates by region

Legend
bold denotes cabinet minister, speaker or party leader
italics denotes a potential candidate who has not received his/her party's nomination
† denotes an incumbent who is not running for re-election or was defeated in nomination contest
* denotes an incumbent seeking re-election in a new district
NOTE: Candidates' names are as registered with Elections New Brunswick

Northern

|-
| style="background:whitesmoke;"|Restigouche West
||
|Gilles LePage4233
|
|David Moreau961
|
|Charles Thériault2540
|
|Beverly A. Mann263
|
|
|
|Travis Pollock(KISS)62
||
|Gilles LePage
|-
| style="background:whitesmoke;"|Campbellton-Dalhousie
||
|Guy Arseneault3720
|
|Diane Cyr1761
|
|Annie Thériault637
|
|Thérèse Tremblay721
|
|Robert Boudreau558
|
|
||
|Vacant
|-
| style="background:whitesmoke;"|Restigouche-Chaleur
||
|Daniel Guitard4430
|
|Charles Stewart826
|
|Mario Comeau831
|
|Paul Tremblay621
|
|
|
|
||
|Daniel Guitard
|-
| style="background:whitesmoke;"|Bathurst West-Beresford
||
|Brian Kenny4351
|
|Yvon Landry1082
|
|Mike Rau503
|
|Anne-Renée Thomas443
|
|
|
|James Risdon(KISS)64
||
|Brian Kenny
|-
| style="background:whitesmoke;"|Bathurst East-Nepisiguit-Saint-Isidore
||
|Denis Landry3550
|
|Michelle Branch858
|
|Robert Kryszko421
| 
|Jean Maurice Landry2026
|
|
|
|
||
|Denis Landry
|-
| style="background:whitesmoke;"|Caraquet
||
|Isabelle Thériault5420
|
|Kevin Haché1827
|
|Yvon Durelle330
|
|Katy Casavant548
|
|
|
|Guilmond Hébert(Ind.)373
||
|Hédard Albert†
|-
| style="background:whitesmoke;"|Shippagan-Lamèque-Miscou
|
|Wilfred Roussel3949
||
|Robert Gauvin4048
|
|
|
|Albert Rousselle578
|
|
|
|Philippe Tisseuil(Ind.)178
||
|Wilfred Roussel
|-
| style="background:whitesmoke;"|Tracadie-Sheila
||
|Keith Chiasson4320
|
|Claude Landry2390
|
|Nancy Benoit390
| 
|Francis Duguay1213
|
|
|
|Stéphane Richardson(Ind.)544
||
|Serge Rousselle†
|}

Miramichi

|-
| style="background:whitesmoke;"|Miramichi Bay-Neguac
||
|Lisa Harris3512
|
|Debi Tozer1741
|
|James (Junior) Denny349
|
|Willie Robichaud718
|
|Terry Collette2047
|
|
||
|Lisa Harris
|-
| style="background:whitesmoke;"|Miramichi
|
|Bill Fraser2825
|
|Peggy McLean1154
|
|Louann Savage189
|
|Douglas Mullin110
||
|Michelle Conroy3788
|
|
||
|Bill Fraser
|-
| style="background:whitesmoke;"|Southwest Miramichi-Bay du Vin
|
|Andy Hardy1909
||
|Jake Stewart2960
|
|Byron J. Connors447
|
|Roger Vautour97
|
|Art O'Donnell2925
|
|Dawson Brideau19
||
|Jake Stewart
|}

Southeastern

|-
| style="background:whitesmoke;"|Kent North
|
|Emery Comeau3301
|
|Katie Robertson1112
||
|Kevin Arseneau4056
|
|Neil Gardner171
|
|
|
|Roger Richard(Ind.)194
||
|Bertrand LeBlanc†
|-
| style="background:whitesmoke;"|Kent South
||
|Benoit Bourque5595
|
|Ricky Gautreau1848
|
|Alain Rousselle1304
|
|Serge Rémi Parent436
|
|
|
|
||
|Benoît Bourque
|-
| style="background:whitesmoke;"|Shediac Bay-Dieppe
||
|Brian Gallant6162
|
|Paulin Blaise Ngweth1353
|
|Michel Albert906
|
|Michel Boudreau764
|
|
|
|
||
|Brian Gallant
|-
| style="background:whitesmoke;"|Shediac-Beaubassin-Cap-Pelé
||
|Jacques LeBlanc5919
|
|Marcel Doiron2081
|
|Greta Doucet888
|
|Lise Potvin428
|
|
|
|
||
|Victor Boudreau†
|-
| style="background:whitesmoke;"|Memramcook-Tantramar
|
|Bernard LeBlanc3137
|
|Etienne Gaudet1518
||
|Megan Mitton3148
|
|Hélène Boudreau410
|
|
|
|
||
|Bernard LeBlanc
|-
| style="background:whitesmoke;"|Dieppe
||
|Roger Melanson5173
|
|Pierre Brine998
|
|
|
|Joyce Richardson1057
|
|
|
|
||
|Roger Melanson
|-
| style="background:whitesmoke;"|Moncton East
||
|Monique LeBlanc3626
|
|Marty Kingston2771
|
|Matthew Ian Clark925
|
|Anthony Crandall424
|
|
|
|
||
|Monique LeBlanc
|-
| style="background:whitesmoke;"|Moncton Centre
||
|Rob McKee2698
|
|Claudette Boudreau-Turner982
|
|Jean-Marie Nadeau771
|
|Jessica Caissie229
|
|Kevin McClure309
|
|Chris Collins(Ind.)1200
||
|Chris Collins
|-
| style="background:whitesmoke;"|Moncton South
||
|Cathy Rogers3099
|
|Moira Murphy2090
|
|Laura Sanderson628
|
|Amy Johnson249
|
|Marilyn Crossman-Riel466
|
|
||
|Cathy Rogers
|-
| style="background:whitesmoke;"|Moncton Northwest
|
|Courtney Pringle-Carver2963
||
|Ernie Steeves3186
|
|Keagan Slupsky437
|
|Cyprien Okana297
|
|Myrna Geldart875
|
|
||
|Ernie Steeves
|-
| style="background:whitesmoke;"|Moncton Southwest
|
|Susy Campos2667
||
|Sherry Wilson2920
|
|Sarah Colwell907
|
|Hailey Duffy503
|
|
|
|
||
|Sherry Wilson
|-
| style="background:whitesmoke;"|Riverview
|
|Brent Mazerolle2053
||
|R. Bruce Fitch3701
|
|Stephanie Coburn542
|
|Madison Duffy249
|
|Heather Collins1005
|
|
||
|Bruce Fitch
|-
| style="background:whitesmoke;"|Albert
|
|Catherine Black1775
||
|Mike Holland3479
|
|Moranda van Geest870
|
|Betty Weir375
|
|Sharon Buchanan1546
|
|James Wilson(Ind.)87
||
|Brian Keirstead†
|-
| style="background:whitesmoke;"|Gagetown-Petitcodiac
|
|Brigitte Noel1153
||
|Ross Wetmore3674
|
|Marilyn Merritt-Gray1097
|
|Anne Marie F. Richardson165
|
|Craig Dykeman1892
|
|Carolyn MacDonald(KISS)56
||
|Ross Wetmore
|}

Southern

|-
| style="background:whitesmoke;"|Sussex-Fundy-St. Martins
|
|Ian Smyth1212
||
|Bruce N. Northrup3816
|
|Fred Harrison505
|
|Dawna Robertson254
|
|Jim Bedford1874
|
|David Raymond Amos54
||
|Bruce Northrup
|-
| style="background:whitesmoke;"|Hampton
|
|Carley Parish1454
||
|Gary Crossman3702
|
|John Sabine743
|
|Layton Peck384
|
|Dana Hansen1246
|
|
||
|Gary Crossman
|-
| style="background:whitesmoke;"|Quispamsis
|
|Aaron Kennedy2078
||
|Blaine Higgs4691
|
|Mark Woolsey445
|
|Ryan Jewkes239
|
|Keith Porter795
|
|
||
|Blaine Higgs
|-
| style="background:whitesmoke;"|Rothesay
|
|Stephanie Tomilson2001
||
|Hugh J. (Ted) Flemming3542
|
|Ann McAllister571
|
|Josh Floyd251
|
|Michael Griffin722
|
|
||
|Ted Flemming
|-
| style="background:whitesmoke;"|Saint John East
|
|Clare Manzer1775
||
|Glen Savoie3017
|
|Lynaya Astephen373
|
|Alex White402
|
|Matthew Thompson1047
|
|
||
|Glen Savoie
|-
| style="background:whitesmoke;"|Portland-Simonds
|
|John MacKenzie1703
||
|Trevor A. Holder3168
|
|Sheila Croteau435
|
|Kim Blue449
|
|
|
|Artie Watson191
||
|Trevor Holder
|-
| style="background:whitesmoke;"|Saint John Harbour
||
|Gerry Lowe1865
|
|Barry Ogden1855
|
|Wayne Dryer721
|
|Jennifer McKenzie836
|
|Margot Brideau393
|
|
||
|Ed Doherty†
|-
| style="background:whitesmoke;"|Saint John Lancaster
|
|Kathleen Riley-Karamanos1727
||
|Dorothy Shephard3001
|
|Doug James582
|
|Tony Mowery414
|
|Paul Seelye922
|
|
||
|Dorothy Shephard
|-
| style="background:whitesmoke;"|Kings Centre
|
|Bill Merrifield1785
||
|Bill Oliver3267
|
|Bruce Dryer731
|
|Susan Jane Shedd342
|
|Dave Peters1454
|
|
||
|Bill Oliver
|-
| style="background:whitesmoke;"|Fundy-The Isles-Saint John West
|
|Rick Doucet2422
||
|Andrea Anderson-Mason3808
|
|Romey Frances Heuff469
|
|Keith LeBlanc203
|
|Doug Ellis1104
|
|
||
|Rick Doucet
|-
| style="background:whitesmoke;"|Saint Croix
|
|John B. Ames2436
||
|Greg Thompson3249
|
|Donna Linton1047
|
|Jan Underhill89
|
|Joyce Wright1466
|
|
||
|John Ames
|}

Capital Region

|-
| style="background:whitesmoke;"|Oromocto-Lincoln-Fredericton
|
|John Fife2306
||
|Mary E. Wilson2399
|
|Tom McLean903
|
|Justin Young159
|
|Craig Rector1741
|
|
||
|Jody Carr†
|-
| style="background:whitesmoke;"|Fredericton-Grand Lake
|
|Wendy Tremblay955
|
|Pam Lynch2433
|
|Dan Weston472
|
|Glenna Hanley114
||
|Kris Austin4799
|
|Gerald Bourque19
||
|Pam Lynch
|-
| style="background:whitesmoke;"|New Maryland-Sunbury
|
|Alex Scholten2210
||
|Jeff Carr3844
|
|Jenica Atwin902
|
|Mackenzie Thomason143
|
|Morris Shannon2214
|
|Danelle Titus14
||
|Jeff Carr
|-
| style="background:whitesmoke;"|Fredericton South
|
|Susan Holt1525
|
|Scott Smith1042
||
|David Coon4273
|
|Chris Durrant132
|
|Bonnie Clark616
|
|
||
|David Coon
|-
| style="background:whitesmoke;"|Fredericton North
||
|Stephen Horsman2443
|
|Jill Green2182
|
|Tamara White1313
|
|Scarlett Tays139
|
|Lynn King1651
|
|
||
|Stephen Horsman
|-
| style="background:whitesmoke;"|Fredericton-York
|
|Amber Bishop1652
|
|Kirk Douglas MacDonald2777
|
|Amanda Wildeman1393
|
|Evelyne Godfrey103
||
|Rick DeSaulniers3033
|
|Sandra Bourque34
||
|Kirk MacDonald
|-
| style="background:whitesmoke;"|Fredericton West-Hanwell
|
|Cindy Miles2404
||
|Dominic Cardy2739
|
|Susan Jonah1490
|
|Olivier Hébert171
|
|Jason Paull1803
|
|
||
|Brian Macdonald†
|-
| style="background:whitesmoke;"|Carleton-York
|
|Jackie Morehouse1556
||
|Carl Urquhart3118
|
|Sue Rickards837
|
|Robert Kitchen255
|
|Gary Lemmon2583
|
|Lloyd Maurey40
||
|Carl Urquhart
|}

Upper River Valley

|-
| style="background:whitesmoke;"|Carleton
|
|Christy Culberson1197
||
|Stewart Fairgrieve2982
|
|Amy Anderson1247
|
|Adam McAvoy82
|
|Stewart B. Manuel2026
|
|
||
|Stewart Fairgrieve
|-
|style="background:whitesmoke;"|Carleton-Victoria
||
|Andrew Harvey3116
|
|Margaret C. Johnson2872
|
|Paula Shaw503
|
|Margaret Geldart114
|
|Terry Leigh Sisson960
|
|Carter Edgar58
||
|Andrew Harvey
|-
| style="background:whitesmoke;"|Victoria-La Vallée
||
|Chuck Chiasson3570
|
|Danny Soucy3212
|
|Paul Plourde468
|
|Lina Chiasson307
|
|
|
|
||
|Chuck Chiasson
|-
| style="background:whitesmoke;"|Edmundston-Madawaska Centre
||
|Jean-Claude (JC) D'Amours4668
|
|Gérald Levesque1437
|
|Sophie Vaillancourt702
|
|Anne-Marie Comeau206
|
|
|
|
||
|Vacant
|-
| style="background:whitesmoke;"|Madawaska Les Lacs-Edmundston
||
|Francine Landry4191
|
|Jeannot Volpé1826
|
|Denis Boulet945
|
|Cécile Richard-Hébert156
|
|
|
|
||
|Francine Landry
|}

Footnotes

References

Further reading

External links
 

Elections in New Brunswick
New Brunswick General
21st century in New Brunswick
2018 in New Brunswick